Lip Synch is a series of five 1989-1990 short films made by Aardman Animations which used vox pops as inspiration for their subject matter. They were commissioned by Channel 4. Nick Park's contribution to the series was the film Creature Comforts, which later won the Academy Award for Best Animated Short of 1990. Channel 4 screened the films as part of their Four-Mations UK season in November 1990.

Peter Lord said:

Films

Going Equipped
Directed by Peter Lord

War Story
Directed by Peter Lord

Next
Directed by Barry Purves

Ident
Directed by Richard Starzak

Creature Comforts
Directed by Nick Park
Winner for Academy Award for Best Animation Short Film

References

British short films
British film series